Maya Ghazal is a UK-based Syrian refugee, a UNHCR Goodwill Ambassador, the first female Syrian pilot, and a Diana Award winner.

Early life in Syria 
Ghazal was born to a father who ran a fabric factory on the outskirts of Damascus and has two brothers.

The Syrian civil war started in 2011, when she was 12 years old.

Life in the United Kingdom 
In September 2015, at the age of 16, with her mother and siblings, following the path that her father took, Ghazal fled Syria to Birmingham, UK. In the UK, she struggled to continue her education, because 16 is a legal school-leaving age in the UK, no school was obliged to accept her, and the schools did not respect her Syrian education credentials.

The family moved from Birmingham to London.

In 2017, Ghazal was one of 20 people to be given a Diana Award.

Ghazal studied aeronautical engineering and pilot education Brunel University London. In 2020, she became the first female Syrian refugee pilot and in 2021 she became a United Nations High Commissioner for Refugees Goodwill Ambassador.

References

External links 

 Maya Ghazal, Education, Aspiration, Compassion, Tedx Talk 2019

Living people
Syrian refugees
Syrian emigrants to the United Kingdom
Women aviators
Syrian aviators
United Nations goodwill ambassadors
United Nations High Commissioner for Refugees Goodwill Ambassadors
Year of birth missing (living people)